Siricilla Rajaiah (born 9 Aug 1954) is an Indian politician and a former member of Lok Sabha, Lower House of the  Parliament of India.

Early life
Rajaiah was born in Lingapur village Manakondur Mandal in Karimnagar district to Bakkaiah and Shanthamma. He did his B.Sc.(Agriculture) from N.G.Ranga Agricultural University.

Career
Siricilla Rajaiah is an Indian National Congress party politician and represented Warangal parliamentary constituency during 2009-2014. He lost his MP seat in 2014 General elections to Kadiyam Srihari. After Kadiyam Srihari resigned, Sircilla Rajaiah was selected by the Congress to contest in the by-elections. Rajaiah did not contest after the death of his grand children and daughter in  law.

Personal life
Rajaiah is married to Madhavi. They have a son and a daughter.

Controversies
Rajaiah's daughter-in-law and three grand children died in a suicidal fire accident in his residence. Rajaiah's son Anil had an extramarital affair which was supported by Rajaiah & his wife. As per the emails and letters revealed after the death of Sarika, it was confirmed that her husband and inlaws harassed her to the core which is widely believed to be cause of the fire suicide. Congress party suspended Rajaiah immediately. As per the sources, Rajaiah & Sarika had a very big fight the night when the incident happened, which provoked Sarika to take this extreme step. Sarika had earlier filed a harassment case against her husband which was in pending. Rajaiah along with his wife and son were arrested by the police in connection with the case....

References

External links
 Official profile

Indian National Congress politicians
Living people
People from Telangana
Telangana politicians
People from Warangal
India MPs 2009–2014
1953 births
Lok Sabha members from Andhra Pradesh